Talmadge L. Hill Field House is a 4,250-seat multi-purpose arena in Baltimore, Maryland. It was opened in 1974, replacing Hurt Gymnasium, and is named for former Morgan State Bears men's basketball coach Talmadge L. Hill. It is home to the Morgan State University Bears men's basketball and women's basketball teams and women's volleyball team. It hosted the MEAC men's basketball tournament in 1994 and 1995.

See also
 List of NCAA Division I basketball arenas

References

College basketball venues in the United States
College volleyball venues in the United States
Sports venues in Baltimore
Morgan State Bears men's basketball
Buildings and structures in Baltimore
Sports venues in Maryland
Indoor arenas in Maryland